Archibald is a masculine given name and a surname.

Archibald may also refer to:

People and characters
Archibald (musician) (1916–1973), American R&B pianist
 Archibald, a character from the animated TV show Archibald the Koala

Other uses
Archibald, Louisiana, a community in the United States
Archibald Prize, an Australian portraiture art prize for painting

See also

Archibald House, several buildings

Archie (disambiguation)
Archbold (disambiguation)
Giuseppe Arcimboldo (1527–1593), Italian painter